Vitaly Sergeyevich Yurchenko (born May 2, 1936) is a former high-ranking KGB disinformation officer in the Soviet Union. After 25 years of service in the KGB, he defected to the United States during an assignment in Rome. After providing the names of two U.S. intelligence officers as KGB agents and claiming that Lee Harvey Oswald was never recruited by the KGB, Yurchenko slipped from the Americans and returned to the Soviets. It is clear that his initial defection was illegitimate, because Yurchenko was awarded the Order of the Red Star from the Soviet government for the successful "infiltration operation."

Background

Upon his defection to the United States, Yurchenko identified two American intelligence officers as KGB agents: Ronald Pelton and Edward Lee Howard. Pelton was later convicted, while Howard fled to the Soviet Union before he could be questioned.

Disappearance
In November 1985, before eating a meal at Au Pied de Cochon, a French restaurant in the Georgetown neighborhood of Washington, D.C., Yurchenko told his CIA guard, "I'm going for a walk. If I don't come back, it's not your fault." Yurchenko did not return.

The building, located at 1335 Wisconsin Avenue NW, now houses a "&Pizza" franchise. A plaque commemorating the event was once displayed in one of Au Pied de Cochon's booths.

Return to the Soviet Union
Several days later, the Soviet Embassy called a press conference, at which Yurchenko announced he had been kidnapped and drugged by the Americans. It is possible that his defection was staged to fool the CIA with wrong leads, to protect Aldrich Ames, an American who worked for the CIA and was then one of the Soviet Union's most important moles within the CIA. The KGB was reported to have secretly interrogated Yurchenko after his return, under the influence of a truth drug, to ensure he had not been recruited by the CIA as a double agent.

Theories
At a 1999 Texas A&M conference attended by several CIA intelligence professionals, as well as KGB General Oleg Danilovich Kalugin, the question of Yurchenko's defection came up. Kalugin stated that Yurchenko started as a real defector, then changed his mind and redefected. Kalugin gave several points:

The KGB typically did not use 'fake defectors' because the defection would be a propaganda problem for the Soviet government. ("People were not supposed to run from the paradise")
Yurchenko was in love with a woman married to a Soviet official and thought that they could be together in the US. This did not work out as planned. 
Yurchenko had a stomach ulcer that worried him greatly and thought it could be cured in the US. It was not. 
Yurchenko's defection was leaked to the media after he had been promised it would not be. 
Yurchenko "felt his freedom to move around was sort of limited by the CIA".
Yurchenko apparently thought the KGB might treat him well because of the cases of recent redefectors like Betov and Chebatriov.

Another panelist also believed he was a legitimate defector. James Olson of the George Bush School of Government and Public Service said "I think he was a very disturbed individual and he redefected out of psychological problems that he had." Paul Redmond said that Sandra Grimes and Jeanne Vertefeuille (of the Aldrich Ames case) also believed Yurchenko was genuine. However, Redmond thought it possible that Yurchenko might have been sent by the KGB as a "starburst".

See also
 List of Soviet and Eastern Bloc defectors
 List of KGB defectors

References

External links
 Col.  Vitaly Yurchenko
 Spooks, shadows, codes, and moles
 If Walls Could Talk: Au Pied De Cochon and 1335 Wisconsin Ave. NW – Part 1 – History of the restaurant from which Vitaly defected back to the Soviet Union

KGB officers
1936 births
Living people
1985 in international relations
Soviet intelligence personnel who defected to the United States